Timothy Dang  is an American actor and theatre director originally from Hawaii of Asian origin.  He served as the artistic director at the Asian American theatre company, East West Players (EWP), in Little Tokyo, Los Angeles, California until 2016. He graduated in 1980 with a bachelor of Fine Arts degree in theatre from the University of Southern California.

Theatre
Dang has been affiliated with EWP since 1980, as actor and director.  He became artistic director in 1993, succeeding Nobu McCarthy, guiding the company's transition from a small theatre company producing Equity 99-seat shows, to a mid-sized company in a 240-seat house in 1995.  As a director, he has mounted productions at Singapore Repertory Theatre, Asian American Theater Company in San Francisco, Mark Taper Forum New Works Festival, Celebration Theatre, West Coast Ensemble, and the Perseverance Theatre in Juneau, Alaska.  He has won numerous awards for directing and performing, including two Ovation Awards.  He has served on the board of LA Stage Alliance.

In 2019, Dang was awarded the Visionary Award at EWP's annual gala for his contributions toward furthering API visibility in the industry.

Filmography

References

External links

Interview by Kenneth Quan, Asia Pacific Arts at UCLA Asia Institute – July 2003

American male stage actors
American male television actors
American male voice actors
American dramatists and playwrights of Asian descent
American theatre directors of Asian descent
USC School of Dramatic Arts alumni
Living people
Place of birth missing (living people)
Year of birth missing (living people)